Chad Zavier Plato (born 21 April 1998) is a Namibian rugby union player who generally plays as a fullback represents Namibia internationally. He was included in the Namibian squad for the 2019 Rugby World Cup which is held in Japan for the first time and also marks his first World Cup appearance.

Career 
He made his international debut for Namibia against Spain on 17 November 2018. He made his first World Cup match appearance in Namibia's opening match of the 2019 Rugby World Cup against Italy in Pool B. He scored a try during the match in a losing cause where Namibia were thrashed by Italy 47-22 which also marked Namibia's 20th consecutive defeat at the World Cup.

References 

1998 births
Living people
Namibian rugby union players
Namibia international rugby union players
Rugby union fullbacks
Rugby union players from Swakopmund
Rugby union wings
Welwitschias players